Liski  is a village in the administrative district of Gmina Dołhobyczów, within Hrubieszów County, Lublin Voivodeship, in eastern Poland, close to the border with Ukraine. The village is located in the historical region of Sokal, Galicia. The Szelemej Family was autochthonous to the village for centuries, with a direct most recent dynastic lineage of Hryc, Roman, Ivan, Dmytro, Hryhory, Ihor, and Paul (Pavlush) Szelemej; who now reside in Winnipeg, Canada.

History
Over the centuries, the Pans of the selo switched over hands not infrequently. By c. 1805, the Kryzhanivskys built a distillery on the other side of the road. They first had to build a brickyard (near the stream below the current church), taking the clay for brickmaking from the Prisilka tract. This to some extent improved the financial situation of the serf peasants, only because the feculent refuse of the distillery served to fatten the cattle and pigs. In addition, Pan Kryzhanivsky gave alcohol for the work, so as to intoxicate the peasants; and suppressing any risk of rebellion. The Muscovites would routinely exchange it for sugar (the tragic story of Grandmother Mary's Tit). Behind the distillery stood the lord's cowsheds and stables.

Water was taken to the plant from the source of the pond by water birch pipes (during the cleaning of the pond in 1935 up to 30 m of such pipes were dug).

In the First World War, all of the manor houses burned down. No one rebuilt them anymore, because Mr. Kryzhanivsky gave his daughter in marriage to Potvorovsky, who lived in the village Gilche. In 1920, having become a senator, he moved to Warsaw with his family.

For the whole of Galicia, and therefore also for the peasants of the village, the year 1848 was extremely memorable with the proclamation of the abolition of serfdom. On this occasion, an iron cross was installed and 4 linden trees were planted. This cross still stands on the left side of the stairs leading to the church.

Before the demolition of the serfdom in 1846, Mr. Kryzhanivsky at the entrance to the village between the roads from Gilch and Kostyashyn built a chapel with a wooden figure of St. Florian, and before entering the village from Perevodov - an iron cross with the crucifixion of Jesus Christ, which in the village was called a figurine. They stand now.

At that time there was an old parish church in the village, and a cemetery around it. The parishioners were faced with the acute question of building a new church. Under the leadership of three villagers (their names were erased from the back wall of the church) the parishioners of the village were raised. Liski, Perevodiv and Kostyashyn on the construction of the parish cathedral. Its construction began in 1872 and was completed in 1875.

References

Villages in Hrubieszów County